WRT (Wallace Roberts & Todd, LLC, formerly known as Wallace McHarg Roberts & Todd (WMRT)) is an urban planning, urban design, landscape architecture, and architecture firm based in Philadelphia, Pennsylvania. WRT is a collaborative practice of city and regional planners, urban designers, landscape architects and architects with additional offices in San Francisco, Miami, Lake Placid, and Dallas.

Founded in 1963 as Wallace McHarg Roberts & Todd (WMRT) by David A. Wallace, Ian McHarg, William H. Roberts, and Thomas A. Todd, the firm had over 200 employees at its peak.

Design projects 
WRT headed the design of Abuja, the new capital of Nigeria, and completed design projects for Inner Harbor in Baltimore. It has also done waterfront projects for the cities of Norfolk and Richmond in Virginia, as well as projects for Indianapolis, Indiana, Honolulu, and Dallas. It redesigned Kakaako Waterfront Park in Honolulu, and designed Hale Koa Hotel and  Fort DeRussy Military Reservation in the Waikiki area of Honolulu. WRT has also done a study of renovating the Ocean Beach in New London County, Connecticut.

WRT is drafting architectural plans for three  parks along the Floyds Fork in Louisville, Kentucky, which is believed to be the largest urban park project in the United States.

Awards 
In 2011, the American Planning Association named WRT as the recipient of its inaugural award, National Planning Award for Achievement in Planning, a recognition for its continual progressive and innovative planning practices. The American Association of Landscape Architects also recognized WRT in 2010 with its National Award for its influential body of work. In 1996, the United States Department of Transportation and the National Endowment for the Arts gave Wallace Roberts & Todd an Honor Award for its proposed design of the Hudson-Bergen Light Rail. The competition for the award included 300 entries, and WRT was one of eleven who received the award.

In 2000, WRT received two awards from Waterfront Center for its role in planning the Hudson River Waterfront Walkway.

In 2004, WRT received an Award of Honor from the American Society of Landscape Architects for its design of parks near the Anacostia River.

In 2008, WRT received the Charter Award from Congress for the New Urbanism for its project titled "A Civic Vision for the Central Delaware".

References

External links 
 

Architecture firms based in Pennsylvania
Companies based in Philadelphia
Design companies established in 1963